Iller Pattacini (Barco di Bibbiano, 7 October 1933 – Barco, 3 September 2006), was an Italian composer of light music, arranger, band leader, and conductor. He worked as a house arranger for Ricordi and under the pen name Lunero penned songs such as Una lacrima sul viso, a success for Bobby Solo in 1964.

Selected discography
As conductor
 Luigi Alva recital "Ay-Ay-Ay" conducting the New Symphony Orchestra of London Decca 1963

References

Italian male conductors (music)
1933 births
2006 deaths
People from the Province of Reggio Emilia
Italian music arrangers
Italian composers
Italian male composers
20th-century Italian conductors (music)
20th-century Italian male musicians